Peplinski is a surname. Notable people with the surname include:

 Jim Peplinski (born 1960), Canadian former National Hockey League player
 Mike Peplinski (born 1974), American curler